Queen Alexandra's Royal Army Nursing Corps (QARANC; known as the QAs) is the nursing branch of the British Army Medical Services.

History
Although an "official" nursing service was not established until 1881, the corps traces its heritage to Florence Nightingale, who was instrumental in lobbying for the support of female military nurses. The Army Nursing Service, which had been established in 1881, and which from 1889 provided Sisters for all Army hospitals with at least 100 beds, had only a small number of nurses in its employ. In 1897, in an effort to have nurses available if needed for war, the service was supplemented by Princess Christian's Army Nursing Service Reserve (PCANSR). Nurses registered for the service and by the beginning of the First Boer War the reserve had around 100 members, but swelled its membership to over 1400 during the conflict. PCANSR eventually became the Queen Alexandra's Imperial Military Nursing Service. On 27 March 1902, Queen Alexandra's Imperial Military Nursing Service (QAIMNS) was established by Royal Warrant, and was named after Queen Alexandra, who became its president.  In 1949, the QAIMNS became a corps in the British Army and was renamed as the Queen Alexandra's Royal Army Nursing Corps. Since 1950 the organisation has trained nurses, and in 1992 men were allowed to join.

The associated Queen Alexandra's Royal Army Nursing Corps Association is a registered charity. Queen Alexandra was president from 1902 until her death in 1925. The following year she was succeeded by Queen Mary.

Territorial Force Nursing Service
The Territorial Force Nursing Service (TFNS) was originally formed to staff the territorial force hospitals at home, and the majority of its members spent their wartime service in the United Kingdom, not only in the 25 territorial hospitals, but also in hundreds of auxiliary units throughout the British Isles. Within a short time they were also employed in the eighteen territorial hospitals abroad, and alongside their QAIMNS colleagues in military hospitals and casualty clearing stations in France, Belgium, Malta, Salonica, Gibraltar, Egypt, Mesopotamia and East Africa.

Territorial Army Nursing Service
The Territorial Army Nursing Service (TANS) was formed in 1920, when the Territorial Force was renamed the Territorial Army. It existed until 1949, when both regular and reserve nurses joined the QARANC. Territorial Army nurses served alongside QAIMNS nurses all over the world, and in all campaigns during WW2.

Ranks
The initial ranking system used by the QAIMNS was as follows.

Senior Corps Appointments
The Colonel In Chief is The Countess of Wessex GCVO GCStJ CD. The Corps has two Colonels Commandant, Colonel Carol Kefford, who was appointed in 2018, and Colonel Kevin Davies MBE RRC OStJ TD DL, who was appointed in 2020.

In January 2016 a new post, Chief Nursing Officer (Army), replaced the role of Matron-in-Chief and the Director Army Nursing Services.

List of Chief Nursing Officers (Army)
Colonel Karen J Irvine (January 2016 – January 2018)
Colonel Alison McCourt OBE ARRC QHN (February 2018 – 2019)
Colonel Alison Farmer ARRC QHN (December 2019 – Nov 2022)
Colonel Paul Jackson (Nov 2022 - Present)

List of Matrons-in-Chief QAIMNS/QARANC

Dame Sidney Browne (1902–1906)
Caroline Keer (1906–1910)
Dame Ethel Becher (1910–1919)
Dame Maud McCarthy (1914–1919) (France & Flanders) 
Dame Sarah Oram (1915–1919) (Middle East)
Beatrice Isabel Jones (1916–1920) for Mesopotamia
Dame Anne Beadsmore Smith (1919–1924)
Florence Hodgins (1924–1928)
Rosabelle Osborne (1928–1930)
Marguerite Medforth (1930–1934)
Daisy Martin, 1934–1938)
Catherine Roy (1938–1940)
Dame Katharine Jones (1940–1944)
Dame Louisa Wilkinson (1944–1946)
Lilian Hunnings (1946–1948)
Brigadier Dame Anne Thomson (1948–1952)
Brigadier Dame Helen Gillespie (1952–1956)
Brigadier Dame Monica Golding (1956–1960)
Brigadier Dame Barbara Cozens (1960–1964)
Brigadier Dame Margot Turner (1964–1968)
Brigadier Barbara Gordon (1968–1973)
Brigadier Helen Cattanach (1973–1977)
Brigadier Joan Moriarty (1977–1981)
Brigadier Vera Rooke (1981–1984)
Brigadier Rita Hennessy (1985–1989)
Brigadier Jill Field (1989–1992)
Brigadier Hilary Dixon-Nuttall (1992–1995)
Brigadier Jane Arigho (1995–1999)
Colonel Bridget McEvilly, 1999–2002)
Colonel Kathy George (2002–2005)
Colonel John Quinn (2005–2008)
Colonel Wendy Spencer (2008–2011)
Colonel Pete Childerley (2011–2013)
Colonel David Bates (2013)

List of Matrons-in-Chief TFNS/TANS
Dame Sidney Browne (1909–1920)
Dame Maud McCarthy (1920–1925)
Dame Anne Beadsmore Smith (1925–1931)
Rosabelle Osborne (1931–1936)
Agatha Phillips (1936–1940)

See also

Other Army Medical Services
 Royal Army Medical Corps (RAMC)
 Royal Army Veterinary Corps (RAVC)
 Royal Army Dental Corps (RADC)

Other Armed Forces Nursing Services
 Princess Mary's Royal Air Force Nursing Service
 Queen Alexandra's Royal Naval Nursing Service

References

Order of precedence

External links

 Official website
 QARANC Association Official website
 History and information about Army Nurses (QARANC Association Official history website)

British administrative corps
Health in Surrey
Medical units and formations of the British Army
Military units and formations established in 1902
Army medical administrative corps
1902 establishments in the United Kingdom
Nursing organisations in the United Kingdom
Organisations based in Surrey
Staff College, Camberley